Dolenje Kališče (in older sources also Dolenje Kališe) is a small abandoned settlement in the Municipality of Velike Lašče in Slovenia. It no longer has any permanent residents or a proper access road. The area is part of the traditional region of Lower Carniola and is now included in the Central Slovenia Statistical Region.

References

External links
Dolenje Kališče on Geopedia

Populated places in the Municipality of Velike Lašče